The Bigs 2 (known in Europe and Australia as The Bigs 2 Baseball) is a baseball sports video game developed by Blue Castle Games and published by 2K Sports for the Xbox 360, PlayStation 3, PlayStation 2, Wii, and PlayStation Portable. The game performs as the direct sequel to The Bigs. The first trailer for the game was released revealing the players like Ozzie Smith, Wade Boggs, Roberto Clemente, and Reggie Jackson and a number of other Hall of Famers. The Milwaukee Brewers All-Star first baseman Prince Fielder is the cover athlete chosen by 2K Sports. For the Xbox 360, PlayStation 3 and Wii editions of the game, the English play-by-play announcer is Damon Bruce while the Japanese announcer is Kasey Ryne Mazak. It was released in 2009. The game was indirectly followed-up by Nicktoons MLB.

Gameplay
The BIGS 2 features an over-the-top playing style, like the first game established. Unlike the first game, The BIGS 2 allows players to play through the full 162 game season and will allow the player to act both as general manager and as the players on the field by allowing the player to trade, draft, and manage other front office activities. The game also includes new game stats called Power, Glove, and Contact. It does not support the Wii MotionPlus for improving control precision.

At bat, the game also gives the player a new hitting system that consists of a "wheelhouse". Pitches thrown into the wheelhouse can be hit more efficiently by the batter or gain more turbo if taken for a strike. Strikes in the wheelhouse also shrink the radius of the wheelhouse. For some hitters, the circle will be bigger based on stats. For example, Alex Rodriguez possesses very high hitting stats. His wheelhouse radius covers nearly the entire strike zone, excluding the four corners.

The game also include real-time sequences where the player can quickly tap a button to catch a ball speeding quickly past a fielder's head. Like the original game, each button simply like (X) will stand for a different base. When the button is pressed, the ball would be thrown to the selected base.

The new "Big Slam" mechanic allows the player to bring four consecutive batters up. If the first batter makes contact a single will automatically register. This will continue until the 4th batter is reached. If the first three players reached base by making contact, the 4th batter, upon making contact, will automatically hit a grand slam.

Become a Legend is a mode where the player creates a character who is recovering from an injury in the Mexican League, is picked up by a Major League team, and then tries to reach "Legendary Status".

Reception

The PlayStation 3 and Xbox 360 versions received "generally favorable reviews", and the PlayStation 2, PSP, and Wii versions received "mixed or average reviews", while the DS version received "generally unfavorable reviews", according to the review aggregation website Metacritic.

References

External links
Official Website
 
 
 
 
 

2009 video games
2K Sports games
Major League Baseball video games
Nintendo DS games
PlayStation 2 games
PlayStation 3 games
PlayStation Portable games
Video games developed in Canada
Wii games
Xbox 360 games
Take-Two Interactive games
Capcom Vancouver games